The Pont de l'Olivar is a bridge across the Sénia River in Spain. The northern side is in the municipality of Ulldecona, comarca of Montsià, province of Tarragona and autonomous community of Catalonia. The southern side is in the municipality of Vinaròs, comarca of Baix Maestrat, province of Castellón and autonomous community of Valencia.

The GR 92 long distance footpath, which roughly follows the length of the Mediterranean coast of Spain, uses the bridge to cross from Catalonia to Valencia. The section of the GR 92 in Valencia has not yet been fully defined or way marked.

References 

Pont de l'Olivar
Pont de l'Olivar